A Collection of Rarities and Previously Unreleased Material is the first compilation album by American lo-fi musician John Maus, released on July 12, 2012. Spanning recordings from 1999 to 2010, the collection selects outtakes from his previous three albums in addition to tracks which had appeared on other compilations.

Track listing

Note
 "Big Dumb Man" and "The Law" feature uncredited writing contributions from Ariel Pink.

References

John Maus albums
2012 compilation albums